There are many places of worship in the town of Piravom in the Indian state of Kerala, catering for the Hindu and Christian faiths. Religious festivals are also celebrated.

Temples
 Pallikkavu Bhagavathi Temple
 Pazhoor Perumthrikkovil Temple of Lord Shiva
 Karavelloor Mahadeva Temple [108 sivalaya fame] kalampoor
 Narasimha swamy Temple Kalampoor
 Desadhipan Amarkkulam Sreekrishna Swamy Temple
 Pisharukovil Temple
 Chalasseril Kalari Paradevatha Kshetram and Gandarva Kshetram, Chalasseril, Piravom
 Pazhoor Pallippattu Kshethram
 Peringamala Bala Sreekrishna Swami Temple, Thekkummoottil Pady, Palachuvadu
 Thiruveeshamkulam Mahadeva Temple Palachuvadu Mulakkulam
 Sree Subramanya Swami temple Palachuvadu
 Sree Purushamangalam Sree Krishna Swami Temple, Kakkad
 Sree Thrikka Narasimha Swami Temple, Piravom
 Kalampookkavu Devi Kshethram
 Parekkunnu Sreedharma Sastha temple
 Karoorkaavu Temple
 Thaliyil Ayyapa Temple, Kalampoor
 Thirumanamkunnu Devi Temple, Thekkummoottil Pady  
 Acharya Kovil Devi Temple, Piravom
 Sree Raja Rajeswari Temple, Pazhoor
 Ittyamattel Dharmadaiva Kshethram, Thottabhagom

Churches

 Rajadhiraja St'marys Malankara Orthodox Syrian Cathedral, Piravom(Valiyapally)
 Holy Kings Knanaya Catholic Church, Piravom (Kochupally)
 Little Flower Syro Malabar Catholic Church, Piravom
St. Thomas Orthodox Syrian church, Nechoor
 St. Mary's Catholic Church, Mulakulam
 St. Luke's C.S.I. Church, Piravom
 St. Mary's Malankara Catholic Church
 Mar Gregorious Catholicate Centre
 Mulakulam Mar Yohanon Ihidiyo Orthodox Syrian church (Mulakulam valiya palli)
 Parumala mar Gregorious Shrine, Palachuvadu
 St.Mary's Syrian Jacobite Church, Kottarakkunnu
 St.Peter's and St.Paul's Orthodox Syrian Church (Parel Pally), Namakuzhy, Mulakulam North
 St. George Orthodox Syrian Church, Karmelkunnu, Mulakkulam
 St.Michael's Church, Kolengai
 St. George Jacobite Syrian Church, Kalampoor
 Christian Fellowship Piravom, Kakkad
 malankara Christian church piravom
 Mulakkulam Christ Marthoma Church, Palachuvadu
 St Andrew's CSI Church, Edappallychira, Palachuvadu

Festivals
 Holy "Danaha perunnal" at Rajadhiraja St. Mary's Jacobite Syrian Cathedral, Piravom (Piravom valiya pally perunnal)
 "Vishudha Rajakanmarude Thirunnal" at Piravom Kochu pally.
 Pazhoor Shivaraathri and thiruvaathira aarattu maholthsavam.
 Easter at Rajadhiraja St. Mary's Jacobite Syrian Cathedral, Piravom (Piravom valiya pally)
 Thiruvathira Mahotsavam of Thiruveeshamkulam temple
 Pallikkavu 'meenabharani' festival 
 Acharikovil meenabharani festival
 Athachamayam Festival
 Kalamboor Kaavu pana Maholsavam [kalampoor], thookkam
 Medam Rohini Mahotsavam, Sree Purushamangalam Temple, Kakkad
 Pazhoor pallippattu temple pana maholsavam
 Makara Vilaku Ulsavam at Thaliyil ayyapa temple [Kalampoor]

Notes

Religious buildings and structures in Ernakulam district